Volvo Cross Country can refer to any of the following vehicles sold by AB Volvo:
Volvo C202
Volvo C3-series (C303, C304 and C306)
Volvo S60 Cross Country
Volvo V40 Cross Country 
Volvo V60 Cross Country
Volvo V90 Cross Country

Cross Country